Valentyna Ivakhnenko and Kateryna Kozlova were the defending champions, having won the event in 2012. The Ukrainian pair managed to defend their title by defeating Başak Eraydın and Veronika Kapshay in the final, 6–4, 6–1.

Seeds

Draw

References 
 Draw

Tatarstan Open - Doubles
Tatarstan Open
Tatarstan Open - Doubles